The Romanian National Opera, Iași  is a public opera and ballet institution in Iași, Romania. It is one of the national opera companies of Romania.

The first performance at the Iași Opera was on 3 November 1956 (the inaugural concert being Tosca by Giacomo Puccini), in the building of the Iași National Theatre, a historic monument that had been built between 1894–1896 by the Viennese architects Ferdinand Fellner and Hermann Helmer.

See also
 George Enescu University of Arts of Iaşi
 Iaşi "Moldova" Philharmonic Orchestra
 List of concert halls
 List of opera houses
 Opera in Romania

References

External links

 

Opera
Opera houses in Romania
Romanian opera companies
Ballet companies
Music venues completed in 1956